Ralph Galloway (born August 27, 1946) is a former professional Canadian football offensive lineman who played eleven seasons in the Canadian Football League for the Saskatchewan Roughriders. He was a CFL All-Star in 1976 and 1977, and named to five consecutive Western Conference All-Star Teams from 1973 to 1977.

References

1946 births
Living people
American players of Canadian football
Canadian football offensive linemen
Sportspeople from Aurora, Illinois
Saskatchewan Roughriders players
Southern Illinois Salukis football players